Linden is an unincorporated community in Woodward Township, Lycoming County, Pennsylvania, United States. Linden has a post office with ZIP code 17744, which opened on April 18, 1832.

References

Unincorporated communities in Lycoming County, Pennsylvania
Unincorporated communities in Pennsylvania